Ko Young-pyo (Hangul: 고영표) (born September 16, 1991) is a South Korean pitcher for the KT Wiz in the KBO League.

References

External links

KT Wiz players
KBO League pitchers
South Korean baseball players
1991 births
Living people
People from Naju
2023 World Baseball Classic players